

Result summary

Sources
Uwe Andersen, Wichard Woyke (Eds.) (1997): Handwörterbuch des politischen Systems der Bundesrepublik Deutschland. , p. 654 (Appendix A, Table 10).
Statistisches Landesamt Baden-Württemberg (2011): Wahl zum 15. Landtag von Baden-Württemberg am 27. März 2011. Vorläufige Ergebnisse. Reihe Statistische Analysen, 1/2011.

See also
 Politics of Baden-Württemberg

 
Politics of Baden-Württemberg